Minuscule 417 (in the Gregory-Aland numbering), ε 423 (in the Soden numbering), is a Greek minuscule manuscript of the New Testament, on parchment. Palaeographically it has been assigned to the 14th century. 
It has full marginalia.

Description 

The codex contains the text of the first three Gospels on 112 parchment leaves with two large lacunae at the beginning and end. The text of the manuscript begins at Matthew 5:44 and ends at Luke 6:9. The text is written in one column per page, in 21-29 lines per page.

There is also a division according to the Ammonian Sections (in Mark 234 Sections, the last in 16:9), with references to the Eusebian Canons (written below Ammonian Section numbers).

It contains lectionary markings at the margin (added by a later hand), and subscriptions at the end of each Gospel (some of them from later hand).

Text 

The Greek text of the codex is a representative of the Byzantine text-type. Aland placed it in Category V.
It was not examined by Claremont Profile Method.

History 

Wiedmann and J. G. J. Braun collated some portions of the manuscript for Scholz (1794-1852). The manuscript was added to the list of New Testament manuscripts by Scholz.
C. R. Gregory saw it in 1886.

The manuscript is currently housed at the Biblioteca Marciana (Gr. I. 25) in Venice.

See also 

 List of New Testament minuscules
 Biblical manuscript
 Textual criticism

References

Further reading 

 

Greek New Testament minuscules
14th-century biblical manuscripts